The year 1800 was the 19th year of the Rattanakosin Kingdom of Siam (now known as Thailand). It was the nineteenth year in the reign of King Rama I.

Incumbents
 Monarch: Rama I
 Front Palace: Maha Sura Singhanat
 Rear Palace: Anurak Devesh
 Supreme Patriarch: Ariyavangsayana (Suk)

Events
 A fire spreads through the Chinatown neighbourhood in Bangkok.

Births

Deaths

References

 
19th century in Siam
Years of the 19th century in Siam
Siam
Siam